Events in the year 2018 in Finland.

Incumbents 
 President: Sauli Niinistö
 Prime Minister: Juha Sipilä
 Speaker: Maria Lohela (until 5 February), Paula Risikko (from 5 February)

Events

28 January – scheduled date for the 2018 Finnish presidential election

Deaths

7 January – Markku Into, poet (b. 1945).
9 January – Heikki Kirkinen, historian (b. 1927).
13 January – Kaj Czarnecki, fencer (b. 1936)
31 January – Olavi Mäenpää, politician (b. 1950)
9 March – Ulla Nenonen, missionary and Bible translator (b. 1933).
23 March – Jaakko Pakkasvirta, film director and screenwriter (b. 1934)
23 March – Jukka Mikkola, politician (b. 1943)
9 June – Lauri Linna, politician, MP (b. 1930).
21 June – Katriina Elovirta, female association footballer and an international match referee (b. 1961).
11 September – Kalle Könkkölä, politician (MP) and human rights activist (b. 1950).

References

 
2010s in Finland
Years of the 21st century in Finland
Finland
Finland